Sir Henry George Outram Bax-Ironside,  (15 November 1859 – 16 April 1929) was a British diplomat, ambassador to Venezuela, Chile, Switzerland and Bulgaria.

Career
Henry George Outram Bax was the only son of John Henry Bax, of Houghton-le-Spring, who had married Sarah Elizabeth Hughes, and in 1866 took the surname Bax-Ironside by royal warrant, when his son became Henry Bax-Ironside. He was educated at Eton College and Exeter College, Oxford and joined the Diplomatic Service in 1883. He served in Copenhagen, Teheran, Vienna, Cairo, and Washington, and was briefly in charge of the Central American Legation in 1897 before being appointed Secretary of the Legation at Pekin in the same year.

Bax-Ironside was First Secretary of the Legation at Stockholm from 1900 until late 1902, when he was appointed Minister Resident and Consul-General at Carácas, serving as such until 1907. He arrived in Venezuela in the months leading up to the Venezuelan crisis of 1902–1903, when the United Kingdom, Germany and Italy imposed a naval blockade against the country from December 1902 until February 1903. Shortly before the actual blockade, Bax-Ironside and other members of his legation were evacuated by a British warship.

He was Minister Plenipotentiary to Chile 1907–09, Minister Plenipotentiary to Switzerland 1909–10, and Minister Plenipotentiary to Bulgaria, 1911–15. While in Bulgaria he was "His Majesty's Special Envoy Extraordinary to attend the ceremonies to be held in commemoration of the coming of age of His Royal Highness Prince Boris, Prince of Tarnovo, Heir to the Throne of Bulgaria" in 1912.

Henry Bax-Ironside was knighted KCMG in 1911.

Family
Bad-Ironside married at St Peter and St Sigfrid's Church in Stockholm on 15 September 1902 Märtha Hedwig Jacquette Gyldenstolpe (1874–1910), daughter of Swedish nobleman and courtier Count August Gustaf Ferson Gyldenstolpe (1839–1919) and his wife Hedvig Fredrike Alice Nieroth (1850–1927). Her brother was the ornithologist Nils Carl Gustaf Fersen Gyldenstolpe.

After the death of his first wife, in 1913, he married  Fanny Agnes (Effie) Jardine, née Willoughby (1857 – c. 1931).

References
BAX-IRONSIDE, Sir Henry (George Outram), Who Was Who, A & C Black, 1920–2016 (online edition, Oxford University Press, 2014)

External links

1859 births
1929 deaths
People educated at Eton College
Alumni of Exeter College, Oxford
Ambassadors of the United Kingdom to Venezuela
Ambassadors of the United Kingdom to Chile
Ambassadors of the United Kingdom to Switzerland
Ambassadors of the United Kingdom to Bulgaria
Knights Commander of the Order of St Michael and St George